Roderick Raynor Paige (born June 17, 1933) served as the 7th United States Secretary of Education from 2001 to 2005. Paige, who grew up in Mississippi, moved from college football coach and classroom teacher to college dean and school superintendent to be the first African American to serve as the U.S. education chief.

Paige was sitting with George W. Bush at the Emma E. Booker Elementary School in Sarasota, Florida, when Bush received the news that a second plane had hit the World Trade Center in the September 11, 2001 attacks.

On November 15, 2004, Paige announced his resignation after overseeing the President's education agenda for four years. White House domestic policy adviser Margaret Spellings was nominated as his successor. The U.S. Senate confirmed her on January 20, 2005 after Bush's inauguration for a second term.

Paige served as interim president of his alma mater, Jackson State University, from November 2016 to June 2017.

Early life and education
Born in Monticello, Mississippi, Paige is the son of public school educators. He earned a bachelor's degree from Jackson State University in Jackson, Mississippi. He earned a master's degree and a Doctor of Education degree in Physical Education from Indiana University Bloomington.

Career
Paige served in the United States Navy from 1955 to 1957. Subsequently, he taught health and physical education and coached at Hinds Agricultural High School and Utica Junior College (now Hinds Community College Utica Campus) in Mississippi, from 1957 to 1963. From 1964 to 1968, Paige served as head football coach at Jackson State University, compiling a record of 25–19–2. At Jackson State, he recruited and coached Lem Barney who later played for the Detroit Lions and was inducted into the Pro Football Hall of Fame. From 1971 to 1975, Paige served as head football coach at Texas Southern University, and served as the university's athletic director from 1971 to 1980.

Paige first moved to Houston in the 1970s, settling in the Brentwood subdivision. He started a move to excise a dump from the edge of the community. The Texas Supreme Court eventually sided with the residents. Paige taught at Texas Southern University from 1980 to 1984 and became the Dean of the College of Education in 1984, where he served until 1994. Paige also established the university's Center for Excellence in Urban Education, a research facility that concentrates on issues related to instruction and management in urban school systems.

As a trustee and an officer of the Board of Education of the Houston Independent School District (HISD) from 1989 to 1994, Paige coauthored the board's 'A Declaration of Beliefs and Visions', a statement of purpose and goals for the school district that called for fundamental reform through decentralization, a focus on instruction, accountability at all levels, and development of a core curriculum. A Declaration of Beliefs and Visions was the catalyst that launched the ongoing, comprehensive restructuring of HISD.  As an HISD trustee, Paige launched a municipal-style, accredited police department at HISD with police officers certified by the Texas Commission on Law Enforcement Officers Standards and Education. Paige's board of education began that effort to provide better school safety, and the HISD police department remains the only school district police department in the country to earn accreditation from the Commission on Accreditation for Law Enforcement Agencies.

Paige became the superintendent of schools of HISD in 1994. As superintendent, Paige created the Peer Examination, Evaluation, and Redesign (PEER) program, which solicits recommendations from business and community professionals for strengthening school support services and programs. He started a system of charter schools that have broad authority in decisions regarding staffing, textbooks, and materials. He saw to it that HISD paid teachers salaries competitive with those offered by other large Texas school districts. Paige made HISD the first school district in the state to institute performance contracts modeled on those in the private sector, whereby senior staff members' continued employment with HISD is based on their performance. He also introduced teacher incentive pay, which rewards teachers for raising test scores.

While he was superintendent, Paige led the district to enter into contracts with private schools to use them to teach some HISD students rather than placing those students into overcrowded public schools. Under Paige HISD contracted with three private schools that were certified by the Texas Education Agency to teach HISD students so their parents did not have to bus them to schools across the city.

Many touted the "Houston Miracle" accomplished under Paige where student test scores rose under his leadership. However, some schools underreported the number of drop-outs during his watch.

Paige served as the Secretary of Education from 2001 to 2005 under US President George W. Bush.  The No Child Left Behind law that set new accountability standards nationwide was developed with Paige's help, and it was Paige's Department of Education that implemented the law. The Bush White House's development of the principles of No Child Left Behind drew in part on the successes of the Houston Independent School District under Paige.

Under Paige, the department earned "clean" audits from Ernst and Young for three consecutive years. Prior to 2001, the department had achieved only one clean audit in its history, and that audit was by the Department's Office of Inspector General.

Paige proposed amendments to the regulations implementing Title IX of the Education Amendments of 1972 to provide more flexibility for educators to establish single-sex classes and schools at the elementary and secondary levels.

Paige once referred to the National Education Association, the nation's largest teachers union, as a "terrorist organization."

Other activities
Paige has served on review committees of the Texas Education Agency and the State Board of Education's Task Force on High School Education, and he has chaired the Youth Employment Issues Subcommittee of the National Commission for Employment Policy of the U.S. Department of Labor. Paige is a member of the NAACP National Association for the Advancement of Colored People. He is a former member of the Houston Job Training Partnership Council, the Community Advisory Board of Texas Commerce Bank, the American Leadership Forum, and the board of directors of the Texas Business and Education Coalition. He is a member of Phi Beta Sigma fraternity. He also serves on the board of trustees for the American College of Education.

Honors and awards
The Houston Independent School District renamed its James Bowie Elementary School after Paige, to become Rod Paige Elementary School. The Lawrence County School District in his hometown of Monticello, Mississippi renamed its middle school Rod Paige Middle School.

The University of Houston presented Paige with an honorary doctoral degree in 2000. Indiana University Bloomington awarded Paige an honorary Doctor of Humane Letters degree in 2017.

Head coaching record

See also

 History of the African Americans in Houston
 List of African-American United States Cabinet members

References

External links
 

|-

|-

1933 births
21st-century American politicians
African-American coaches of American football
African-American members of the Cabinet of the United States
American university and college faculty deans
Cincinnati Bearcats football coaches
George W. Bush administration cabinet members
Houston Independent School District superintendents
Indiana University alumni
Jackson State Tigers football coaches
Jackson State University alumni
Living people
Mississippi Republicans
People from Monticello, Mississippi
Presidents of Jackson State University
Texas Republicans
Texas Southern Tigers athletic directors
Texas Southern Tigers football coaches
United States Secretaries of Education
20th-century African-American sportspeople
21st-century African-American sportspeople